Combined Country is an Australian rugby union team that was formed for the 2013 British & Irish Lions tour to Australia. Unlike the 2001 tour, the Lions faced a combined team made up of players representing the Queensland Country and New South Wales Country rugby unions.

The match was the fourth game of the tour and was played in Newcastle on 11 June 2013 at Hunter Stadium. Referee Steve Walsh was in charge of the game.

The Combined Country team was coached by former Wallaby prop, Cameron Blades.

Squad

On 10 June a 23-man squad was announced to play the British & Irish Lions. Included were nine players from Super Rugby, 10 Country players (seven QLD, three NSW) and four players from Premier rugby in New South Wales and Queensland.

Reds flanker Beau Robinson was in the initial squad but withdrew following an injury he suffered while playing for the Reds against the Lions on 8 June. He was replaced by his Reds' teammate, Jarrad Butler. The other player forced to withdraw from the squad due to injury was NSW Country flyhalf Ben Greentree. He was replaced in the starting lineup by Queensland Country player Shaun McCarthy, with fellow Queensland Country player Rory Arnold brought into the lineup on the bench to complete the squad.

Melbourne Rebels player Tim Davidson was named as captain.

Head coach: Cameron Blades

Forwards

Backs

Result
The Lions beat Combined Country by ten tries, seven of which converted (64 points) to nil.

See also
 Australia national rugby union team
 Australian Rugby Union
 Queensland Country (NRC team)
 New South Wales Country Eagles

References

Australian rugby union teams
Rugby union teams in Queensland
Rugby union teams in New South Wales